Robert Blair was a Scottish association football center forward who spent most of his career in the American Soccer League.

Blair played for Helensburgh which competed in Scottish Football League Division Three. In 1925, Blair left Scotland to sign with the Boston Soccer Club of the American Soccer League, although he was still under contract to Helensburgh. When Blair arrived, he quickly established himself as a prolific goalscorer. During the 1925–26 season, he scored thirty-six goals in thirty-three games, putting him third on the scoring chart. His form continued the next season when he averaged a goal a game. In 1927, he began the season with Boston, but moved to the Fall River Marksmen after nine games. In 1928, he again began the season with one team, the Marksmen, but then played for two more: J&P Coats and Boston again. In 1929, he finished his professional career with the New Bedford Whalers which competed part of the season in the ASL and part in the Eastern Professional Soccer League.

References

External links
 

American Soccer League (1921–1933) players
Boston Soccer Club players
Eastern Professional Soccer League (1928–29) players
Fall River Marksmen players
J&P Coats players
New Bedford Whalers players
Scottish footballers
Scottish expatriate footballers
Scottish Football League players
Year of birth missing
Year of death missing
Greenock Morton F.C. players
Helensburgh F.C. players
Pawtucket Rangers players
Association football forwards
Scottish expatriate sportspeople in the United States
Expatriate soccer players in the United States
Sportspeople from Argyll and Bute
People from Helensburgh